Sir Jonathan Frederic Parker (born 8 December 1937) is a retired British Lord Justice of Appeal.

Education
Sir Jonathan was born in Bishop's Stortford, Hertfordshire, the son of Sir Edmund Parker  (1908–1981) and Elizabeth Mary Butterfield (died 1984). His father was a distinguished accountant who was senior partner of Price Waterhouse & Co. and president of the Institute of Chartered Accountants in England and Wales from 1967–68.  He was educated at Winchester College and then Magdalene College, Cambridge.

Career
He was called to the Bar in 1962.  He was appointed as Queen's Counsel in 1979.  He became a Bencher of the Inner Temple in 1985, and served as head of chambers at 11 Old Square, Lincoln's Inn.

He became a High Court Judge in the Chancery Division in 1991 when he received the customary knighthood.  He then became a Lord Justice of Appeal in 2000, whereupon he was appointed to the Privy Council in the usual way.  He retired from the bench in 2007.

He also served as the Attorney-General of the Duchy of Lancaster from 1989 to 1991 and as Vice-Chancellor of the County Palatine of Lancaster from 1994 to 1998.

Judicial decisions
As a Lord Justice of Appeal and as a judge at first instance, Sir Jonathan Parker was involved a number of important judicial decisions, including:
 In Plus Group Ltd v Pyke [2002] EWCA Civ 370
 Kaur v MG Rover Group Ltd [2004] EWCA Civ 1507
 Re Barings plc (No 5) [1999] 1 BCLC 433 (High Court)
 Oldham v Kyrris [2003] EWCA Civ 1506
 Green v Lord Somerleyton [2003] EWCA Civ 198
 Murad v Al-Saraj [2005] EWCA Civ 959
 Regentcrest plc v Cohen [2001] 2 BCLC 80
 Rock (Nominees) Ltd v RCO Holdings Ltd [2004] EWCA Civ 118
 Bhullar v Bhullar [2003] EWCA Civ 424
 Royal Trust Bank v National Westminster Bank plc (High Court)
 Lipkin Gorman v Karpnale Ltd [1989] 1 WLR 1340 (Court of Appeal)
 Re Spectrum Plus Ltd [2004] EWCA Civ 670 (Court of Appeal)

Personal life 
Sir Jonathan is married to Maria-Belen Burns, daughter of publisher Thomas Ferrier Burns . He and Lady Parker have three sons: James (born 1968), Oliver (born 1969), and Peter (born 1971), and a daughter, Clare (born 1972).

References

1937 births
Living people
20th-century English judges
Alumni of Magdalene College, Cambridge
People educated at Winchester College
Members of the Privy Council of the United Kingdom
Knights Bachelor
Lords Justices of Appeal
Chancery Division judges
Attorneys-General of the Duchy of Lancaster
People from Bishop's Stortford
21st-century English judges